Glen Richards is an Australian veterinary physician and businessman. He is the founder and CEO of Greencross, the largest pet care company in Australia.

Education

Richards studied veterinary science at the University of Queensland in 1988, as well as a master's degree at James Cook University.

Career

Richards practised companion animal medicine and surgery in Brisbane, Townsville and London. He purchased Currajong Veterinary Hospital in Townsville in 1994 which was the start of his veterinary company that became known as Greencross.

Richards is the founder of Greencross, the largest pet care company in Australia. The company is publicly trade on the ASX and operates under the names Greencross, Petbarn, City Farmers, and Animates. Richards is a company director for six allied health and veterinary business. In addition to Greencross, he is a director for both PetBarn and Montserrat Day Clinics. He is also an advisor for enterprises that spun out of Shark Tank, including the furniture distributor OneWorld.

Richards joined season 2 of Shark Tank in 2016 as an investor, replacing John McGrath.

References

External links 
 Greencross board of director page

Living people
1967 births
University of Queensland alumni
James Cook University alumni
Australian veterinarians
Male veterinarians
Participants in Australian reality television series
Australian investors